Bailou is a town in Huaiyang District, Zhoukou, Henan, China. , it had 19 villages under its administration:
Yuzhuang Village
Gaolou Village
Xulou Village
Daxu Village
Pangzhuang Village
Wugutai Village
Luanlou Village
Guolou Village
Lizhuang Village
Daliulou Village
Xiaoxu Village
Shawo Village
Laolou Village
Dasong Village
Shamaoliu Village
Taohe Village
Dahao Village
Shenmiao Village
Dazheng Village

See also
List of township-level divisions of Henan

References

Township-level divisions of Henan
Zhoukou